This is a list of the National Register of Historic Places listings in Kerr County, Texas.

This is intended to be a complete list of properties listed on the National Register of Historic Places in Kerr County, Texas. There are six properties listed on the National Register in the county. Three of these are individually listed as Recorded Texas Historic Landmarks while two more include Recorded Texas Historic Landmarks within their sites.

Current listings

The locations of National Register properties may be seen in a mapping service provided.

|}

See also

National Register of Historic Places listings in Texas
Recorded Texas Historic Landmarks in Kerr County

References

External links

Kerr County, Texas
Kerr County
Buildings and structures in Kerr County, Texas